The 1987 Swedish Golf Tour was the fourth season of the Swedish Golf Tour, a series of professional golf tournaments held in Sweden and Denmark.

Schedule
The season consisted of 14 events played between April and September.

Order of Merit

References

Swedish Golf Tour
Swedish Golf Tour